Tembele is a 2022 Ugandan mental health drama directed by Morris Mugisha. It is Uganda's first-ever submission to the Academy Award Best International Feature category.

Plot 
Set in Kampala, the film centers around Tembele, a garbage collector, who works 12 hour shifts. Tembele and his wife, Mawa, are expecting their first child together. When the child dies soon after birth, Tembele has a mental breakdown and is in complete denial that his son has died. The next day he returns to work happy while everyone else is mourning.

Cast 

 Patriq Nkakalukanyi as Tembele
 Ninsiima Ronah Rita as Mawe
 Cosmas Sserubogo as Segi

Reception and awards 
Tembele won Best Film, Best Actor and Best Supporting Actor honors at the 2022 Uganda Film Festival Awards and Best Achievement in Cinematography at the 2022 Africa Movie Academy Awards. The 10 AMAA nominations categories it was nominated for included Best Film in an African Language, Best Achievement in Costume Design, Best Achievement in Sound Track, Best Achievement in Sound, Best Achievement in Cinematography, Achievement in Screenplay, Best Actor in a Leading Role, Best Actress in a Leading Role, Best Director and Best Film.

In September 2022, it was selected by the Uganda Academy Selection Committee (UASC) to represent Uganda at the 95th Academy Awards in the Best International Feature Film category, winning over Nalwawo by Erik Emokor and November Tear by Richard Nondo.

References

External links 

 

2022 films
2022 drama films
Ugandan drama films